Bayındır is a district of İzmir Province of Turkey and the central town of the district which is situated in the valley of the Küçük Menderes.

History
Its name in classical antiquity was Caystrus (Κάϋστρος), near Smyrna. Its present name derives from Turkish people who in the 11th c. AD settled there; they were members of the Bayındır clan, one of the 24 original Oghuz clans. From 1867 until 1922, Bayındır was part of the Aydin Vilayet of the Ottoman Empire. In 1997, the town population was 18,100. It is connected with İzmir by a branch of the Aydın railway, and has a trade in olives, olive oil, cotton, figs, raisins and tobacco.

Transport
The district is crossed by the Torbalı-Tire railway, with a branch to Ödemiş. It is served by regional trains from/to İzmir (Basmane-Ödemiş and Basmane-Tire), and counts the stations of Arıkbaşı, Karpuzlu, Elifli, Furunlu, Bayındır (in the capital town), Yakaköy and Çatal.

References

External links

Populated places in İzmir Province